Grizzy and the Lemmings is a French CGI animated television series created by Antoine Rodelet and Dave Charier. The show has been awarded the Best Animated Series Kids Programming at the 2018 Kidscreen Awards and Best Youth Programme at Lauriers de la Radio et de la Télévision 2018. 

This is a list of episodes of the series, with their names (in English and French), including series number, the original air date, and an episode synopsis.

Series overview 
<onlyinclude>

Episodes

Season 1 (2016-2017)

Season 2 (2018–2019)

Season 3 (2021-2022)

Special Event

Short (Season 2S) 
A special episode based on the show titled as COVID-19 Alert was aired on March 27, 2020, and October 5, 2020, on YouTube during the COVID-19 pandemic. It is based on the COVID-19 pandemic. This video was only created as a warning to children to protect themselves from the Coronavirus disease and to avoid catching it.

Another episode that ran for 54 seconds has no intro and is a subscriber celebration.

References

External links 
 

Lists of French television series episodes
Animated television series without speech